Frasier is an American television sitcom, revived as Frasier (2023 series).

Frasier may also refer to:

 Frasier Crane, the fictional character on television sitcoms Frasier and Cheers
 Fraser fir, a type of coniferous tree. "Frasier" is a misspelling of "Fraser".

People 
 Anne Frasier (born c. 1950s), American author
 Mary M. Frasier (1938–2005), American psychologist
 Margo Frasier (fl. c. late 20th century), American jurist and law-enforcement specialist

Other uses 
 Frasier syndrome, a genetic abnormality
 Frasier the Sensuous Lion, at Lion Country, Irvine, CA
 Fraisier cake, a French dessert

See also 
 Fraser (disambiguation)
 Frazer (disambiguation)
 Frazier
 List of Frasier episodes
 Minor characters on Frasier